Alexander Charles Hurst (born 6 October 1999) is an English professional footballer who plays as a midfielder for  club York City.

A former Academy player at Crewe Alexandra, he won a move from Matlock Town to Bradford (Park Avenue) in October 2018, before being picked up by Port Vale in August 2019. He returned on loan at Bradford (Park Avenue) during the 2019–20 season. He played 26 games for Port Vale in the 2020–21 season, but featured just twice the following season and joined York City in June 2022.

Career

Early career
Hurst came through the Academy at Crewe Alexandra and played for the "Railwaymen" at under-18 and under-23 level. He joined Northern Premier League Premier Division side Matlock Town in August 2018 after impressing "Gladiators" boss Dave Hoole on trial. He was signed by National League North club Bradford (Park Avenue) on 19 October 2018. He made his debut for the Avenue the following day, and after coming on for Nicky Wroe as a 68th-minute substitute went and scored a goal with five minutes in what finished as a 6–0 victory at Nuneaton Borough. He was handed his first start by manager Mark Bower on Boxing day, as Bradford recorded a 5–1 victory at Guiseley. He ended the 2018–19 season with 13 starts and 12 substitute appearances to his name, including a brief cameo in a 1–0 defeat at Spennymoor Town in the play-off quarter-finals.

Port Vale
On 3 August 2019, Hurst signed a two-year contract with English Football League side Port Vale after impressing manager John Askey on trial, though was immediately returned to Bradford (Park Avenue) on a five-month loan deal. Bradford manager Garry Thompson said that "He's worked hard and deserves everything he's got. Whilst we naturally want to keep our best players, the transfer shows that we are committed to developing talent but also won't stand in anyone's way to progress." On 24 September, he made his debut for the "Valiants" in a 3–2 victory at Macclesfield Town in the EFL Trophy, coming on as a 90th-minute substitute for Scott Burgess; the rules of the competition meant that he was able to play for the club during his loan spell at Bradford. On 23 January, the loan deal was extended until the end of the 2019–20 season. Bradford remained rooted to the foot of the table, though Vale coach Dave Kevan felt the experience was character building for Hurst.

He scored his first goal for the club on 10 November 2020, with a 15-yard strike in a 4–2 win over Liverpool U21 in the group stages of the EFL Trophy. He made his League Two debut on 5 December, coming on as a 69th-minute substitute for Cristian Montaño in a 6–3 victory at Bolton Wanderers. He made his first start in the EFL seven days later, and Askey said that "for an hour I thought he was excellent" in the 1–1 draw with Colchester United at Vale Park. He scored his first goal in the English Football League on 6 March, during a 3–2 defeat at Cheltenham Town. He signed a new two-year contract the following month, with manager Darrell Clarke commenting that "we are very much looking forward to seeing Hursty continue his development". Hiwever he played just two games in the 2021–22 promotion campaign, though director of football David Flitcroft said: "Alex has faced tough competition for game time here at Port Vale but has remained professional throughout and has played a key role as a member of our extended squad".

York City
On 20 June 2022, Hurst joined newly-promoted National League club York City for an undisclosed fee. The move saw Hurst once again play under John Askey, the manager who had signed him for Port Vale.

Style of play
Hurst is a versatile player, able to operate as a left-sided midfielder, left-back, attacking midfielder or forward. He has pace, good ball control skills and has good strength despite his small build.

Career statistics

References

1999 births
Living people
Footballers from Stoke-on-Trent
English footballers
Association football fullbacks
Association football midfielders
Association football forwards
Matlock Town F.C. players
Bradford (Park Avenue) A.F.C. players
Port Vale F.C. players
York City F.C. players
Northern Premier League players
National League (English football) players
English Football League players